Buffalo Creek is a  tributary of the Juniata River in Perry County, Pennsylvania, in the United States.

Buffalo Creek joins the Juniata River at the borough of Newport.

See also
List of rivers of Pennsylvania

References

External links
U.S. Geological Survey: PA stream gaging stations

Rivers of Pennsylvania
Tributaries of the Juniata River
Rivers of Perry County, Pennsylvania